The Camden Masonic Temple, also known as Mount Zion Lodge #211, is a historic Masonic Lodge located at Camden, Carroll County, Indiana.  It  was built in 1902, and is a three-story Romanesque Revival style brick and limestone building.   It was used historically as a meeting hall, as a specialty store, as a department store, as a professional building, and as a multiple dwelling.

It was listed on the National Register of Historic Places in 2003.

References

External links

Masonic buildings in Indiana
Clubhouses on the National Register of Historic Places in Indiana
Romanesque Revival architecture in Indiana
Masonic buildings completed in 1902
Buildings and structures in Carroll County, Indiana
National Register of Historic Places in Carroll County, Indiana